Nieroba is a Polish surname. Notable people with the surname include:

 Antoni Nieroba (born 1939), Polish footballer and manager
 Norbert Nieroba (born 1964), German boxer

See also
 

Polish-language surnames